Batcheba Louis (born 15 June 1997) is a Haitian footballer who plays as a forward for French Division 1 Féminine club FC Fleury 91 and the Haiti women's national team.

International goals
Scores and results list Haiti's goal tally first

References

External links 
 

1997 births
Living people
People from Nord (Haitian department)
Haitian women's footballers
Women's association football forwards
Division 1 Féminine players
Haiti women's international footballers
Competitors at the 2014 Central American and Caribbean Games
Haitian expatriate footballers
Haitian expatriate sportspeople in France
Expatriate women's footballers in France
GPSO 92 Issy players